The Journal of Medical Internet Research is a peer-reviewed open-access medical journal established in 1999 covering eHealth and "healthcare in the Internet age". The editors-in-chief are Gunther Eysenbach and Rita Kukafka. The publisher is JMIR Publications.

Publisher 
The journal is published by JMIR Publications, which was a cofounder of the Open Access Scholarly Publishers Association and is known for other journal titles as well, which mostly focus on specific subtopics within eHealth, such as mHealth (JMIR mHealth and uHealth), serious games (JMIR Serious Games), mental health (JMIR Mental Health), and cancer (JMIR Cancer). JMIR Publications is also notable for being one of the fastest-growing companies in Canada in 2019 .

Controversy
JMIR Publications has faced criticism for initially using the same editorial board of its main journal for its sister journals and for offering a fast-track review pathway for a surcharge. Editor-in-chief Gunther Eysenbach commented that the spin-off journals would eventually have their own boards and that the fast-track option does not affect the quality or integrity of its peer-review processes. As of the end of 2016, all journals had their own editorial boards.

Impact
According to the Journal Citation Reports, the journal has a 2021 impact factor of 7.08. According to a survey among 398 health informatics experts in 2015, the journal was ranked as a top tier journal in the field of health informatics.

Other journals from the publisher 
Among the 32 JMIR Publications journals, 5 journals, in addition to J Med Internet Res, have been ranked in the Journal Citation Reports. 

These include:
 JMIR Public Health and Surveillance (2021 impact factor of 14.56)
 JMIR Mental Health (2021 impact factor of 6.33)
 JMIR mHealth and uHealth (2021 impact factor of 4.95)
 JMIR Serious Games (2021 impact factor of 3.36)
 JMIR Medical Informatics (2021 impact factor of 3.23)

References

External links

Publisher site: JMIR Publications

Open access journals
English-language journals
Monthly journals
Biomedical informatics journals
Publications established in 1999